Needham Market railway station is on the Great Eastern Main Line (GEML) in the East of England, serving the town of Needham Market, Suffolk. Its three-letter station code is NMT.

The station is currently operated by Abellio Greater Anglia, which also runs all trains serving the station. It sees regular services between Ipswich and Stowmarket, whereafter trains branch off to  via the Ipswich to Ely Line. No main line London trains call.

The station appears in Britain's 100 Best Railway Stations by Sir Simon Jenkins.

History
The station was originally opened with the name Needham by the Ipswich & Bury Railway in 1846. The main building, described as "one of the best in East Anglia" by Biddle, was designed in a grand Jacobean style with decorative brickwork by Frederick Barnes and was completed by the contractor, Daniel Revitt, in 1849. It was later slightly simplified, and the platforms rebuilt, by the London and North Eastern Railway (LNER).

It was closed to passengers by the Eastern Region of British Railways in 1967 but reopened as Needham Market in 1971. The main building, now in alternative use, is a Grade II listed building. It was restored in 2000 by Spacia Ltd, and won an award in the 2002 National Railway Heritage Awards. In April 2015 work commenced to improve the station, including the installation of an anti-slip composite fibreglass platform (Dura Platform) which features a patented design with in-built water management and snow-melting capabilities. However, this did not include making the London-bound platform wheelchair accessible.

Services
The following services typically call at Needham Market:

References

Railway stations in Suffolk
Grade II listed buildings in Suffolk
Grade II listed railway stations
Former Great Eastern Railway stations
Railway stations in Great Britain opened in 1846
Railway stations in Great Britain closed in 1967
Railway stations in Great Britain opened in 1971
Greater Anglia franchise railway stations
1846 establishments in England
Reopened railway stations in Great Britain
Needham Market